Mecynorhina torquata is a beetle from the subfamily Cetoniinae, tribe Goliathini.

Description
Mecynorhina torquata is among the largest flower beetles in the world, only surpassed by the goliath beetles. The basic colour is green with whitish markings on the elytra. The males have a horn in the forehead.

Distribution
These beetles are native to tropical Africa, especially in the Democratic Republic of the Congo, Cameroon and Uganda.

Research 
Cyborgs of M. torquata have been created by implanting electrodes and a radio device. By sending radio signals to make the electrodes stimulate the muscles, it is possible to control the beetle's walking and flight.

Subspecies
 Mecynorhina torquata immaculicollis (Kraatz, 1890)
 Mecynorhina torquata poggei (Kraatz, 1890)
 Mecynorhina torquata torquata (Drury, 1782)
 Mecynorhina torquata ugandensis Moser, 1907 – sometimes treated as a separate species

References

 Biolib
  Beetlespace

Cetoniinae
Beetles described in 1782